The Charter of the Orenburg Kirghiz in 1824 was designed in 1822 by  Orenburg Governor-general P. Essen. The draft of a similar charter for the Junior Zhuz was adopted by the Asian Committee in 1824. A decision was immediately taken to abolish the khanate.

History 
Internecine conflict developed Between the sultans of the Junior Zhuz. In 1822, the Governor of the Orenburg region, P.K. Essen, sent a draft of "Charter on the Orenburg Kyrgyz" to the capital. The project was sent for revision to the Asian Committee. The final version was approved by Tsar Alexander I in the spring of 1824. Khan Shergazy (the khan) was summoned to Orenburg. He was given a life stipend and his power in the Junior Zhuz was abolished.

A few years later, in 1828, Junior Zhuz was divided into 3 parts: The West( tribes Baiuli), The Centre( The Zhetira tribe) and the East (Alimuliu tribe with a few kipchak and argin). Each part was led by a sultan. The Zhuz was under the influence of the General-governor of the region.

Thereafter Russian influence and power over Junior Zhuz increased.

Because of the expansion of Russian territory and the growth of capitalism a reform had to be passed, “The Administrative reform of 1868-1869.

References 

Orenburg Oblast
Political charters
Treaties of Russia